Un rostro en mi pasado is a Mexican telenovela produced by Ernesto Alonso for Televisa in 1989. Based on the Mexican telenovela produced in 1960 Un rostro en el pasado.

Sonia Infante, Joaquín Cordero and Juan Peláez starred as protagonists, while Ana Patricia Rojo and Armando Araiza starred as antagonists.

Cast 

Sonia Infante as Elisa Estrada de Zertuche
Joaquín Cordero as Armando Zertuche
Armando Araiza as Roberto Zertuche Estrada
Ana Patricia Rojo as Miranda Zertuche Estrada
Amara Villafuerte as Clara Zertuche Estrada
Alejandro Landero as Enrique Zertuche Estrada
Flor Trujillo as Raquel Zertuche
Gabriela Ruffo as Karla Duboa
Juan Peláez as Carlos Duboa
Chantal Andere as Mariela Vidal
Manuel Ojeda as Dr. Leonardo Sánchez
Silvia Manríquez as Elvira Duboa
Alejandro Ruiz as Ricardo Gil Olmedo
Lizzeta Romo as Graciela Romero
Gloria Jordán as Tina
Gilberto Román as Ernesto Vidal
Yolanda Ciani as Rosario
Katia del Río as Rita Romero
Rosario Gálvez as Pacita
Humberto Elizondo as Rafael Reyes
Rafaello as Hugo
Norma Lazareno as Lina Mabarak
Dolores Beristáin as Doña Irene
Belén Balmori as Zoila Sánchez
Marco Hernán as Alex Bretón
Eduardo Liñán as Joaquín Herrera
Armando Palomo as Adán Ferreira
Adalberto Parra as Ruperto
Stephanie Salas as Sabrina
Sergio Sánchez as Ringo
José María Torre as Roberto (child)
Faviola Elenka Tapia as Miranda (child)
Aurea Rangel as Karla (child)
Raúl Castro as Enrique (child)
Andrea Torre as Mariela (child)
Frieda Klein as Clara (child)
Mariana Navarro as Rita (child)
Lorena Enríquez as Magda Cervantes
María Regina as Georgina Vidal
José Zambrano as Nicolás de la Torre
Rodrigo de la Mora as Ramiro Lavalle
José Miguel Checa as Fernando Lavalle
José Antonio Ferral as Miguel
Carmen Cortés as Aurora Candia
Cinthia Zurita as Adriana
Michelle Mayer as Julia Ferrer
Rocío Yaber as Aurelia Ferrer
Gabriel Chávez Aguirre as Ignacio Ferrer
Alex Phillips as Damián Villalobos
Silvia Campos as Yolanda
Antonio Miguel as Antonio Mabarak
Lucía Castell as Leonora Gil Olmedo
Araceli Aguilar as Adela
Ángeles Marín as Chabela
Sara Monar as Diana Reyes
Luis Miguel Valles as Nando
Rafael Montalvo as Edmundo Suárez

Awards

References

External links 

1989 telenovelas
Televisa telenovelas
1989 Mexican television series debuts
1990 Mexican television series endings
Mexican telenovelas
Spanish-language telenovelas
Television shows set in Mexico